Kim Chon-man is a North Korean diver who competed at the 2008 Summer Olympics.

External links

1987 births
Living people
North Korean male divers
Olympic divers of North Korea
Divers at the 2008 Summer Olympics
Asian Games medalists in diving
Divers at the 2006 Asian Games
Divers at the 2010 Asian Games
Asian Games silver medalists for North Korea
Asian Games bronze medalists for North Korea
Medalists at the 2006 Asian Games
Medalists at the 2010 Asian Games
21st-century North Korean people